Pararguda is a genus of moths in the family Lasiocampidae. The genus was erected by George Thomas Bethune-Baker in 1908. All the species identified in this genus were found in Australia.

Species
Based on Lepidoptera and Some Other Life Forms:
Pararguda nasuta (Lewin, 1805)
Pararguda tephropsis (Turner, 1924)
Pararguda nana (Walker, 1855)
Pararguda albida (Walker, 1865)
Pararguda spodopa (Turner, 1904)
Pararguda crocota (Turner, 1911)
Pararguda australasiae (Fabricius, 1775)
Pararguda rufescens (Walker, 1855)
Pararguda crenulata (Lucas, 1894)
Pararguda dasymalla (Turner, 1924)
Pararguda ecnoma (Turner, 1924)
Pararguda diamphidia (Turner, 1936)
Pararguda nigriventris (Walker, 1862)

References

Lasiocampidae